Michael Carlin may refer to:

 Mike Carlin (born 1958), comic book writer and editor
 Michael Carlin (art director), Australian art director